Kvapil (feminine Kvapilová) is a Czech surname, it may refer to:
 Hana Kvapilová, Czech stage actress
 Jaroslav Kvapil, Czech poet
 Jaroslav Kvapil (composer), Czech composer
 Marek Kvapil, Czech ice hockey player
 Michala Kvapilová, Czech volleyball player
 Radoslav Kvapil, Czech pianist
 Travis Kvapil, American race car driver

Czech-language surnames